The 1941 Amateur World Series was the fourth Amateur World Series (AWS), an international men's amateur baseball tournament. The tournament was sanctioned by the International Baseball Federation (which titled it the Baseball World Cup as of the 1988 tournament). The tournament took place, for the third consecutive time, in Cuba. It was contested by nine national teams playing eight games each from September 27 through October 22 in Havana. Venezuela won its first AWS title.

Format
All teams participated in a single-match round-robin, resulting in eight games for each team.  In case of a tie for best record at the end of the round-robin, a single playoff game would be held to determine the overall winner.

Playoffs

Final standings

Players
 
 Héctor Benítez collected at least one hit in each of his nine games and led the series with three triples.
 Daniel Canónico (4–0, 1.69 ERA) was the most dominant pitcher in the series, winning five of the team's games including the series-tying and deciding games against Cuba.  He would go on to a career as a player and manager in the Venezuelan Professional Baseball League.
 José Antonio Casanova earned the Most Valuable Player award for the tournament.
 José Pérez Colmenares drove in five runs and scored 11 times in the nine contests.
 Chucho Ramos was on the team as an outfielder and would have a brief stint with the Cincinnati Reds in 1944.
 Dalmiro Finol, who years later would hit the first home run in Venezuelan professional baseball (1946) as well as the first homer in Caribbean Series history (1949).

 
 Bernardo Cuervo hit a .400 average and led the tournament with 10 runs batted in.
 Andrés Fleitas (.378) was the brother of Washington Senators shortstop Ángel Fleitas.
 Clemente González (.395) had the most hits in the tournament with 17.
 Connie Marrero (3-0, 0.46 ERA) was very effective during round-robin play, but suffered the loss in the playoff game.
 Rogelio Martínez (2-0, 0.00 ERA) would have a cup of coffee with the Washington Senators in 1950.
 Julio Moreno (1-1, 1.29 ERA) was another effective pitcher for the team.  He went on to play four seasons with the Washington Senators in the early 1950s.
 Tony Ordeñana (.256) led the tournament with 14 runs scored, and go on to play a single major league game with the Pittsburgh Pirates in 1943.
 Nap Reyes (.343) contributed for a second Amateur World Series.

 
 Victor Canales hit five doubles to lead the tournament and would go on to play for several years in the minor leagues.

 
 León Kellman hit the only home run of the series and would go on to a career in the Negro leagues and Mexican League.
 Pat Scantlebury pitched for the team and would go on to have a long Negro leagues career as well as a short stint with the Cincinnati Reds.

 
 Carlos Navas would take the base stealing title for the tournament by swiping six bags.

Miguel Angel Jimenez - Pitcher

References

External links
Historia de la Copa Mundial (1938-1948) (Spanish)
IV Serie Mundial de Béisbol Amateur – 1941 (Spanish)

Amateur World Series, 1941
Baseball World Cup
1941
1941 in Cuban sport
September 1941 sports events
October 1941 sports events
Baseball competitions in Havana
20th century in Havana